Abraham-Louis-Rodolphe Ducros (21 July 1748 – 18 February 1810) was a Swiss painter, watercolourist and engraver, and was a main figure in the 'pre-romantic' movement.

Biography 
Abraham-Louis-Rodolphe was the son of a drawing master at Yverdon College. He was born in Moudon and came to Geneva in 1769, to study under Nicolas-Henri-Joseph de Fassin. He subsequently left for Italy, and established himself in Rome at the end of 1776. In March 1778, he was employed by two Dutch noblemen to accompany them on a four-month voyage to the Kingdom of the Two Sicilies and Malta where he created close to three hundred watercolours (held currently by the Rijksmuseum in Amsterdam).

He stayed in Rome from 1777 to 1793 as a landscape painter. In collaboration with the engraver Giovanni Volpato, he published in 1780 twenty-four engravings depicting views of Rome and its surroundings. In 1782, he received a commission from Paul Alexandrovitch of Russia for two paintings and, in 1782, a commission from Pope Pius VI. In 1784, Gustav III of Sweden was his largest purchaser. But his primary commissioners were still English noblemen on the Grand Tour of Europe, for example Sir Richard Colt Hoare, Milford Hervey, and Lord Breadalbane.

The unrest arising from the French Revolution led to the expulsion of many French from the Papal States. Ducros, considered a Jacobin, was expelled in 1793; he subsequently settled in Abruzzo, then in Naples until 1799, where he created numerous works depicting Campania and Mount Etna. He sold some of his works to William Hamilton and some seascapes to Lord Acton. Ducros came again to Malta in 1800, and here painted views of Valletta for the General Thomas Graham, who had recently conquered the island.

Ducros returned to Switzerland in the summer of 1807, first of all to Nyon, then to Lausanne. In Geneva he was named an honorary member of the Society of Arts in 1807. In Bern, he was named professor of painting at the Academy in 1809, but died, in Lausanne, before being able to assume the post, on 18 February 1810. His landscapes are, for the most part, kept in the Cantonal Museum of Fine Arts in Lausanne and at the English estates of Stourhead and Bramall Hall.

Work 

Ducros is notable among watercolourists of his time for his large canvases, limited palette and forceful tones (achieved through application of gum) which allowed his paintings to be hung alongside oils at exhibitions. Ducros sold some of his paintings, including several to Sir Richard Colt Hoare, at whose estate of Stourhead they are still kept. However, he retained the majority of his paintings to use as the basis for engravings, which he sold to 'Grand Tour' travellers.

Sources

References

1748 births
1810 deaths
18th-century Swiss painters
18th-century Swiss male artists
Swiss male painters
People from the canton of Vaud
Swiss expatriates in Italy